From may refer to:

 From, a preposition 
 From (SQL), computing language keyword
 From: (email message header), field showing the sender of an email
 FromSoftware, a Japanese video game company
 Full range of motion, the travel in a range of motion
 Isak From (born 1967), Swedish politician
 Martin Severin From (1825–1895), Danish chess master
 Sigfred From (1925–1998), Danish chess master
 From (TV series), a sci-fi-horror series that debuted on Epix in 2022